Renée Elisabeth Johanna van Wegberg (born 14 October 1984 in Horst, Limburg) is a Dutch singer and actress, known for her roles in the musicals Urinetown (as Lot Kleinhart), Wicked (as the alternate Elphaba), Joseph and the Amazing Technicolor Dreamcoat (as the narrator), and Annie (as Grace Farrell).

References

Living people
1984 births
21st-century Dutch singers
21st-century Dutch women singers